Silvestry Francis Koka (born 15 May 1965) is a Tanzanian CCM politician and Member of Parliament for Kibaha Town constituency since 2010.

References

1965 births
Living people
Chama Cha Mapinduzi MPs
Tanzanian MPs 2010–2015
Lyamungo Secondary School alumni
Tambaza Secondary School alumni
University of Dar es Salaam alumni